Majidah Nantanda is a Ugandan football manager and former player. She has been a member of the Uganda women's national team, first as a player and later as a coach.

International career
Nantanda capped for Uganda at senior level during the 2000 African Women's Championship.

Managerial career
Nantanda has coached the Uganda women's national football team at under-20 and senior levels.

References

External links

Living people
Sportspeople from Kampala
Ugandan women's footballers
Uganda women's international footballers
Ugandan football managers
Female association football managers
Women's association football managers
Year of birth missing (living people)
Women's association footballers not categorized by position